Eugène Adrien Roland Georges Garros (6 October 1888 – 5 October 1918) was a French aviation pioneer and fighter pilot. Garros began a career in aviation in 1909 and performed many early feats before joining the French army and becoming one of the earliest fighter pilots during World War I. In 1928, the Roland Garros tennis stadium was named in his memory; the French Open tennis tournament takes the name of Roland Garros, which is held in this stadium.

Biography 
Eugène Adrien Roland Georges Garros was born in Saint-Denis, Réunion, and studied at the Lycée Janson de Sailly and HEC Paris.

At the age of 12, he caught pneumonia, and was sent to Cannes to recover. He took up cycling to restore his health, and went on to win an inter-school championship in the sport. He was also keen on football, rugby and tennis. When he was 21 he started a car dealership in Paris. He was a close friend of Ettore Bugatti and in 1913 became the first owner of the Garros Bugatti Type 18, later named  Black Bess by its second owner, British racing driver Ivy Cummings, which survives today at the Louwman Museum in the Netherlands.

Aviation 

During his summer holiday in 1909, at Sapicourt near Reims, staying with a friend's uncle, he saw the Grande Semaine d'Aviation de la Champagne which ran from 22 to 29 August. After this, he knew he had to be an aviator.

He started his aviation career in 1909 flying a Demoiselle (dragonfly) monoplane, an aircraft that flew well only if it had a small lightweight pilot. He gained Ae.C.F. licence no. 147 in July 1910. In 1911 Garros graduated to flying Blériot XI monoplanes and entered a number of European air races with this type of aircraft, including the 1911 Paris to Madrid air race and the Circuit of Europe (Paris–London–Paris), in which he came second.

By 1913 he was flying the faster Morane-Saulnier monoplanes, and on 23 September gained fame for making the first non-stop flight across the Mediterranean Sea from Fréjus-Saint Raphaël in the south of France to Bizerte in Tunisia in a Morane-Saulnier G. The flight commenced at 5:47 am and lasted for nearly eight hours, during which time Garros resolved two engine malfunctions. The following year, Garros joined the French army at the outbreak of World War I.

Myth of first air battle 
Reports published in August 1914 claimed Garros was involved in the "first air battle in world history" and that he had flown his plane into a Zeppelin, destroying the airship and killing its pilots and himself. This story was quickly contradicted by reports that Garros was alive and well in Paris. Such early reports maintained that an unidentified French pilot had indeed rammed and destroyed a Zeppelin, however, German authorities denied the story. Later sources indicated the first aerial victory against a Zeppelin occurred in June 1915 and earlier reports, including that of Garros, had been discounted.

Development of interrupter gear 

In the early stages of the air war in World War I, the problem of mounting a forward-firing machine gun on combat aircraft—without having the bullets hit the propeller—was considered by several people.  As a reconnaissance pilot with the Escadrille MS26, Garros had made several attempts at shooting down German aircraft; however, these efforts were unsuccessful due to the difficulty in hitting an aircraft with a hand-held carbine. He visited the Morane-Saulnier works in November or December 1914 to discuss the problem. 

Raymond Saulnier had begun work on a synchroniser (which times the firing of the gun with the position of the propeller) before World War I and had taken out a patent for a workable mechanism by 14 April 1914, however circumstances beyond his control resulted in its being tested with the Hotchkiss 09/13 portative machine gun, which proved unsuitable due to an inconsistent firing rate. As a workaround, Garros, with the help of his mechanic, Jules Hue, developed protective wedges, which were fitted to the slightly narrowed propeller blades which deflected the occasional round which would have otherwise struck the propeller. With a workable installation now fitted to his Morane-Saulnier Type L parasol monoplane, Garros achieved the first ever shooting-down of an aircraft by a fighter firing through a tractor propeller, on 1 April 1915 and two more victories over German aircraft were achieved on 15 and 18 April 1915. The Aero Club of America awarded him a medal for this invention three years later.

On 18 April 1915, Garros was hit by ground fire, and he came down in German-controlled territory where he failed to destroy his aircraft completely before being taken prisoner: most significantly, the gun and armoured propeller remained intact. Fokker had been working on a system for at least six months before Garros's aircraft fell into German hands, but this convinced the German military to request a similar mechanism. 

With the Fokker's introduction of an interrupter gear (which prevents the gun from firing while the propeller is in front of it), the tables were turned on the Allies.  Fokker's aircraft shot down many Allied aircraft, leading to what became known as the Fokker Scourge.

POW camp internment and escape 
After almost three years in captivity in various German POW camps Garros managed to escape on 14 February 1918 together with fellow aviator lieutenant Anselme Marchal. They made it to London via the Netherlands and from there he returned to France where he rejoined the French army. He returned to Escadrille 26 to pilot a SPAD, and claimed two victories on 2 October 1918, one of which was confirmed.

Death 
On 5 October 1918, he was shot down and killed near Vouziers, Ardennes, a month before the end of the war and one day short of his 30th birthday. His adversary was probably German ace Hermann Habich from Jasta 49, flying a Fokker D.VII.

Legacy
Garros is sometimes called the world's first fighter ace; however, he shot down only four aircraft, while the criterion for "ace" was set at five or more victories. The honour of becoming the first ace went to another French airman, Adolphe Pégoud, who had six victories early in the war.

The Stade Roland Garros tennis centre constructed in Paris in the 1920s was named after him. It accommodates the French Open, one of the four Grand Slam tennis tournaments. Consequently, the tournament is officially called Les Internationaux de France de Roland-Garros (the "French Internationals of Roland Garros").

La Réunion's international airport is named the Roland Garros Airport. There is a monument to Garros in Bizerte at the site of his landing, which is called "Roland Garros Plaza". The town of Houlgate in Normandy has named their promenade after Roland Garros in celebration of it being the location he broke the altitude record from.

According to Vũ Trọng Phụng's urban novel, Dumb Luck (1936), during colonial times the Hanoi government named the city's main tennis stadium after Roland Garros.

The French car manufacturer Peugeot commissioned a 'Roland Garros' limited edition version of its 205 model in celebration of the tennis tournament that bears his name. The model included special paint and leather interior. Because of the success of this special edition, Peugeot later created Roland Garros editions of its 106, 108, 206, 207, 208, 306, 307, 406, and 806 models.

See also 
History of the Armée de l'Air (1909–1942)

References

Citations

Bibliography

External links

1888 births
1918 deaths
Aerial warfare pioneers
Aviators killed by being shot down
Escapees from German detention
Flight altitude record holders
French aviation record holders
French military personnel killed in World War I
French prisoners of war in World War I
French World War I flying aces
French World War I pilots
Lycée Janson-de-Sailly alumni
People from Saint-Denis, Réunion
World War I prisoners of war held by Germany
Officiers of the Légion d'honneur